Qaleh Rafi may refer to:
 Qaleh Rafi, Hamadan
 Qaleh Rafi, Kermanshah